Pimania is a text-and-graphics adventure game written by Mel Croucher and released by Automata UK in 1982 for  the BBC Micro, ZX Spectrum, Dragon 32, and Sinclair ZX81. It was the first real life video game treasure hunt to be released. It was inspired by the 1979 Kit Williams book, Masquerade. Automata gave a prize of a golden sundial worth £6,000 for the first person to solve the various cryptic clues to its location that were hidden within Pimania.

Gameplay 

The player negotiates a surreal landscape with the aid of the mysterious Pi-Man, Automata's mascot. The B-side of the game cassette features a bizarre Pimania song played on a VL-Tone and vocals. The Pi-Man also starred in his own long-running, surreal, comic-strip, soap opera in the company's adverts on the back page of Popular Computing Weekly magazine and appeared in several subsequent games by the company of different kinds, such as Piromania and Piballed.

The sundial was eventually won in 1985 by Sue Cooper and Lizi Newman, who correctly worked out that it could only be found on 22 July (because π is sometimes rounded to 22/7) at the Litlington White Horse on Hindover Hill near Litlington, East Sussex.

Legacy
The BASIC source code listing of the game is available online.

In 2010 Feeding Tube Records, a small label in the United States, released "Pimania: The Music of Mel Croucher & Automata U.K., Ltd.", a deluxe vinyl LP album of the musical B-Sides to the Pimania games, as well as tracks from other Automata releases. The album came with extensive liner notes by Croucher and Caroline Bren, as well as a large poster featuring selections from the original Automata print campaigns and was issued in a one time edition of 500 copies.

References

External links

Information and the solution to the game
"Pimania: The Music of Mel Croucher & Automata U.K., Ltd." LP
Pimania ZX81 Collection entry with the original inlay scan and program listing.  An emulator is available on the site to play the game online.

1982 video games
BBC Micro and Acorn Electron games
Commercial video games with freely available source code
Dragon 32 games
Puzzle hunts
Video games developed in the United Kingdom
ZX81 games
ZX Spectrum games
Automata UK games